Carlo of Naples and Sicily (4 January 1775 – 17 December 1778) was Duke of Calabria as heir to Naples and Sicily.

Biography

Born at the Caserta Palace near Naples, he was known as the Duke of Calabria at birth as the heir apparent to his father's throne. His mother was a daughter of Empress Maria Theresa and thus sister of Marie Antoinette.

A member of the House of Bourbon, he was a prince of Naples and Sicily by birth. He was the hereditary prince of Naples. His birth allowed his mother to have a place in the Council of State, pursuant to his parents' marriage contract.

Carlo died of smallpox aged 3. Six of his younger siblings would die of smallpox also: Princess Maria Anna (in 1780), Prince Giuseppe (in 1783), Prince Gennaro (in 1789), Prince Carlo Gennaro (also in 1789), Princess Maria Clotilde (in 1792) and Princess Maria Enricheta (also in 1792).

He was buried at the Church of Santa Chiara in Naples.

References

1775 births
1778 deaths
People from Caserta
House of Bourbon-Two Sicilies
Neapolitan princes
Heirs apparent who never acceded
Sicilian princes
Deaths from smallpox
Dukes of Calabria
Burials at the Basilica of Santa Chiara
Italian Roman Catholics
Hereditary Princes of Naples
18th-century Roman Catholics
Knights of the Golden Fleece of Spain
Royalty and nobility who died as children
Sons of kings